Pathogen is a 2006 zombie horror independent film written, directed, and produced by  Emily Hagins, who was twelve at the time of the film's production. The film was released on March 25, 2006 and focuses on several middle school students who discover that an infection is turning people into zombies.

Plot
Fourteen-year-old Dannie (Rose Kent-McGlew) is horrified when a waterborne disease caused by bacteria begins to spread, but believes that the disease is somehow linked to her recurring dreams. As the disease becomes an epidemic, it's revealed that the disease not only kills those it infects but also turns them into zombies. As Dannie and her friends try to find the solution to the disease, they come across researcher Sue, who might hold the key to both the zombie disease and Dannie's dreams.

Cast
 Tiger Darrow as Christine
 Rose Kent-McGlew as Dannie
 Alec Herskowitz as Sam
 Tony Vespe as Cameron
 Alex Schroeder as Stacy
 Rebecca Elliott as Researcher Sue
 Estrella Gonzales as Jen
 C. Robert Cargill as Janitor
 Joy M. Furman	as Dannie's Mom
 Ben Gonzalez as News Reporter
 Amanda Haight	as Chloe
 Jim Hurley as Health Department Official
 Dannie Helen Loraine Knowles as School Nurse
 Harry Jay Knowles as Voice Actor
 Melissa Martinez as Pharmaceutical Rep
 Natalie Nooner as Ashley
 Jay Giovanni Ramirez as Davey, Zombie Kid
 Jose Ramirez as Doctor
 Sebastian Rosas as Zombie
 Ernest Rosas Roze as Math Teacher / Zombie

Production
Hagin completed the film's script in 2004 and filming took place in Austin, Texas. In 2005 she received a grant from the Texas Filmmakers Production Fund for post-production work, which she used to partially replace equipment necessary for post-production work that had been stolen during the shooting. A documentary entitled Zombie Girl: The Movie followed Hagin's filmmaking process.

Release 
The film was released on Blu-ray on March 29, 2022.

Reception
Dread Central gave Pathogen four out of five blades, commenting that "Although this film was seen as a learning experience, many indie film-makers could learn a few things from it."

References

External links
 

2006 films
2006 horror films
Films directed by Emily Hagins
Films shot in Texas
American independent films
American zombie films
2006 directorial debut films
2000s English-language films
2000s American films